Konstantin Balšić or Konstantin Balsha ( 1378–died 1402), was a lord of the Balšić family, who ruled over lands in northern Albania.

Life
Konstantin was the son of Đurađ I Balšić, the Lord of Zeta (r. 1362–1378) and his wife, Teodora Dejanović (the daughter of despot Dejan). After his father's death in 1378, he inherited a small parcel of land between the rivers of Bojana and Drin.

To expand links in the western Balkans, he married his sister Eudokia to the Florentine Despot of Ioannina Esau de' Buondelmonti.

In late 1394, Konstantin was installed as governor of Krujë by the Ottomans and married Marco Barbarigo's first wife, the Albanian princess Helena Thopia, daughter of Karlo Thopia. Helena was Konstantin's first cousin as Helena's mother Vojislava and Konstantin's father Đurađ were brother and sister. Helena's maternal grandfather and Konstantin's paternal grandfather was Balša I. He was sent to become the Balšićs head as an Ottoman protégé and apparently failed, losing his stronghold, Dagnum, to his cousin, Đurađ II, in 1395.

Konstantin was very faithful to Sultan Bayezid I. On 17 May 1395 he fought in the Battle of Rovine and witnessed the deaths of some Serb noblemen but managed to survive himself. Of those who died included his cousin Konstantin Dejanović, after whom he was named, and King Marko Mrnjavčević.

In a Venetian document dating 8 August 1401, he is mentioned as "Konstantin, lord of Serbia, in the territory around our territory of Durachi (Durrës)" (Constantini domini Servie, teritorii, quod est circa teritorium nostrum Durachii). In 1402, he was executed in Durazzo for unknown reasons, but it is generally believed that his absence at the Battle of Ankara had something to do with this. After Konstantin's death his wife Helena and their son Stefan first went to Venetians and then lived with her sister Maria. Since Maria was married to Filip Maramonte, the Venetians and Ragusans often referred to Stefan Balšić as "Stefan Maramonte".

In 1920 Yugoslav historian Milan Šufflay published, under pseudonym Alba Limi, a historical novel about Konstantin Balšić.

See also

References

Konstantin
Year of birth unknown
1402 deaths
Ottoman vassalage
History of Durrës
Krujë